WUSP may refer to:

 WUSP (AM), a radio station (1550 AM) licensed to serve Utica, New York, United States
 WUSP-LD, a low-power television station (channel 15, virtual 25) licensed to serve Ponce, Puerto Rico